Leopoldo Feliz Severa was a Puerto Rican politician and senator.

In 1917, Feliz Severa was elected as a member of the first Puerto Rican Senate established by the Jones-Shafroth Act. He represented the District IV (Mayagüez).

References

Members of the Senate of Puerto Rico
Year of birth missing
Year of death missing